Clara Margaret Codd (10 October 1876 – 3 April 1971) was a British writer, suffragette, socialist feminist, and theosophist. She went to jail for the suffragettes and then devoted her life to the Theosophical Society.

Life
 
Codd was born in Bishops Tawton at Pill House in 1876. She was the first child of Henry Frederick Codd and Clara Virginia (née Botto) Codd. She had nine siblings and she was taught at home by a fair number of governesses. At the age of fifteen she became an atheist. After her father's death the family moved to Geneva where Codd herself worked as a governess, a costume model and she travelled to play the violin and piano. She was converted to Theosophy after hearing the first President of the Theosophical Society, Henry Steel Olcott, give a talk in Geneva.

In 1903 she was in the UK when she joined the Theosophical Society and in 1907 she also joined the militant Women's Social and Political Union. Aeta Lamb asked her to help organise a visit by Christabel Pankhurst and Annie Kenney and the following year she was the elected secretary of the WSPU branch in Bath. Nearby was the home of Mary Blathwayt who was another suffragette. Her parents lived at Eagle House in Batheaston. Nearly all the prominent British suffragettes visited the house and Codd would stay over and sleep with Annie Kenney.

Codd was arrested on 13 October 1908 outside the House of Commons after Emmeline Pankhurst Christabel Pankhurst and Flora Drummond had been arrested for organising "the rush" on parliament. It was the day that parliament was debating the "Women's Enfranchisement Bill". 60,000 people attended the event and she was one of the 37 people arrested. She was sentenced to a month in prison. Christabel Pankhurst was keen to find her a job but Codd refused the offer. In 1909 she planted a tree at Eagle House. She appeared to then drift away from the group.

She worked briefly as a teacher before she became more involved with the Theosophical Society. She then went to their headquarters in Adyar in India for two years. Codd never left this work as she lectured for the society around the world for the rest of her life.

Codd died in Heatherwood Hospital in 1971.

Works
 On Lecturing (1921)
 So Rich a Life (1951)
 The Way of the Disciple (1964)
 The Mystery of Life (1963)
 Trust your Self to Life (1968)

References

1876 births
1971 deaths
People from North Devon (district)
20th-century British women writers
British Theosophists
British socialist feminists
Eagle House suffragettes